Share of throat is a beverage industry term that refers to the proportion of the world's beverage consumption produced by a single company. The term was originally coined by Coca-Cola as "throat share", in order to measure how much of the world's beverages were theirs, but is now more commonly referred to as share of throat.

References 

Vocabulary
Usage share
Drinks